The Lateness of the Hour is the second album by the American musician Eric Matthews, released in 1997. "My Morning Parade" was originally included as a 7" single with the vinyl version of the album. The album was part of the ork pop trend of the 1990s.

Production
The Lateness of the Hour was produced by Tony Lash and Matthews, who also played flugelhorn and harpsichord, among other instruments. Jason Falkner played guitar on the album; Matthews's younger brother Wes also contributed. Three songs, "Gilded Cages", "To Clear the Air", and "Festival Fun", do not include drums, bass, or guitar. Matthews recorded the vocals and acoustic guitars with Manley microphones.

Critical reception

Salon wrote that "it's ironic that the album's best moments are those when he tears down his Brill Building façade and turns the guitars up a bit, as on 'Everything So Real' and especially 'The Pleasant Kind', the one song where Matthews' melodic sensibility doesn't sound grave-robbed." Entertainment Weekly noted that "this smooth, lovely set of melancholia is never overwhelmed by its ambitions."

The Boston Globe stated that "Matthews' exceptional music is lovely and strange; if only his opaque lyrics were equally evocative." Rolling Stone determined that "the piano, bass and spare percussion on 'No Gnashing Teeth' serve an arrangement that would make Brian Wilson proud." The Dayton Daily News opined that Matthews "sings in a hushed whisper reminiscent of the late folkie Nick Drake."

AllMusic wrote that "the best songs have an effortless grace, while even the weaker moments are enjoyable because of the lavish arrangements." The St. Catharines Standard listed it among the best 20 albums of 1997. The Philadelphia Inquirer also considered it to be one of 1997's best, deeming it a "florid masterwork."

Track listing

References

1997 albums
Sub Pop albums
Eric Matthews (musician) albums